Daniel Ely Dean (January 3, 1909 – September 13, 2004) was an American long-distance runner. He competed in the men's 5000 metres at the 1932 Summer Olympics.

References

External links
 

1909 births
2004 deaths
Athletes (track and field) at the 1932 Summer Olympics
American male long-distance runners
Olympic track and field athletes of the United States
Place of birth missing
20th-century American people